Boxley–Sprinkle House is a historic home located at Roanoke, Virginia.  It was built in 1907, and is a two-story, five bay, Colonial Revival style brick dwelling.   It has a central projecting bay, full height entrance portico and hipped roof.  The house was originally constructed in the Victorian style, with the entrance facing 26th Street (then 5th Avenue) with a corner turret, projecting polygonal bays and a wraparound porch. In the 1940s, the house was redesigned in the Colonial Revival style and the entrance was changed to face Crystal Spring Avenue.

It was listed on the National Register of Historic Places in 2004.

References

Houses on the National Register of Historic Places in Virginia
Colonial Revival architecture in Virginia
Houses completed in 1907
Houses in Roanoke, Virginia
National Register of Historic Places in Roanoke, Virginia